Chas (Time) was a daily newspaper published in Latvia, the third among Russian language dailies and the eighth among all dailies by subscription, as of January 2010. In 2012 the paper merged with Vesti segodnya. The final issue appeared on December 7, 2012.

References

Defunct daily newspapers
Defunct newspapers published in Latvia
Russian-language newspapers published in Latvia
Mass media in Riga
1997 establishments in Latvia
Newspapers established in 1997
2012 disestablishments in Latvia
Publications disestablished in 2012